Chase Finlay (born 1990) is a former ballet dancer and former principal dancer with the New York City Ballet who has also danced with the Mariinsky Theatre in Russia.

Early life
Born in Fairfield, Connecticut, Finlay began his dance training at the age of 8, at Ballet Academy East in New York City. During the summer of 2007, he began studying at the School of American Ballet, the official school of New York City Ballet (NYCB). He subsequently enrolled there as a full-time student.

Career

Finlay became an apprentice with NYCB in September 2008. He became a member of the corps de ballet in September 2009. While still a member of the corps de ballet, he danced the title role in George Balanchine's Apollo.

He was promoted to soloist in July 2011, and to principal in February 2013.

Alexandra Waterbury lawsuit 

In September 2018, Finlay was sued by his 20-year-old ex-girlfriend, Alexandra Waterbury, for allegedly sharing nude photos of her and other female dancers with male company members without their consent. Finlay resigned from the New York City Ballet in August 2018 during the company's investigation.

Roles
Featured roles since joining the New York City Ballet:

George Balanchine
 Apollo
 Brahms-Schoenberg Quartet (First Movement)
 Divertimento No. 15
 Duo Concertant
 Liebeslieder Walzer
 A Midsummer Night's Dream (Divertissement, Lysander)
 Mozartiana
 George Balanchine's The Nutcracker™ (Cavalier, Hot Chocolate)
 Robert Schumann's "Davidsbündlertänze"
 Stars and Stripes
 Symphony in C (First Movement)
 Tchaikovsky Pas de Deux

Ulysses Dove
 Red Angels

Sean Lavery
 Romeo and Juliet

Peter Martins
 Fearful Symmetries
 Morgen
 River of Light
 The Sleeping Beauty (Gold)
 Swan Lake (Pas de Quatre)
 Todo Buenos Aires

Jerome Robbins
 2 & 3 Part Inventions
 Glass Pieces
 Interplay
 N.Y. Export: Opus Jazz
 West Side Story Suite

Christopher Wheeldon
 Polyphonia
 Soirée Musicale

Originated featured roles in
 Peter Martins: Bal de Couture, Mirage
 Angelin Preljocaj: Spectral Evidence

Originated corps roles in
 Alexey Miroshnichenko: The Lady with The Little Dog
 Alexei Ratmansky: Namouna, A Grand Divertissement
 Lynne Taylor-Corbett: The Seven Deadly Sins
 Christopher Wheeldon: Estancia

Honors
In 2010, Finlay became the first recipient of the Clive Barnes Award for dance.

References

Living people
1990 births
American male ballet dancers
New York City Ballet principal dancers
School of American Ballet alumni
People from Fairfield, Connecticut